The Chairman of the Central Committee of the Chinese Communist Party was the leader of the Chinese Communist Party. The position was established at the 8th National Congress in 1945 and abolished at the 12th National Congress in 1982, being replaced by the general secretary. Offices with the name Chairman of the Central Executive Committee and Chairman of the Central Committee existed in 1922–1923 and 1928–1931, respectively.

History and functions
Between 1922 and 1925, Chen Duxiu (still Party Secretary) served as chairman of the Central Executive Committee, but the name was changed to General Secretary of the Central Executive Committee in 1925. The post was first introduced in March 1943, when the Politburo decided to discharge Zhang Wentian as General Secretary.  As his replacement, Mao Zedong, who had been the de facto leader of the party since the Long March, was named Chairman of the Politburo of the CCP Central Committee. The seventh CCP National Congress introduced the post of Chairman of the Central Committee into the party constitution, and in 1956 the General Secretary was given the day-to-day management of the Party Secretariat. The chairman was elected by the Central Committee in a plenary session and had full powers over the Central Committee, the Politburo, and its Standing Committee.

The 1956 Party Constitution introduced the multiple Vice-chairman post; since 1945, actual vice-chairmanship had been exercised by the Secretariat members. Liu Shaoqi was the highest-ranking vice-chairman from 1956 to 1966.

The 1969 Party Constitution (adopted by the 9th Congress) introduced the post of a single vice-chairman, in order to give more authority to Lin Biao as Mao's successor. The 1973 Constitution (adopted by the 10th Congress) re-introduced the collective vice-chairmanship. In 1976, Hua Guofeng was named First Vice-chairman of the Central Committee, a post previously held unofficially by Liu Shaoqi from 1956 to 1966; Zhou Enlai from 1973 to 1975; and Deng Xiaoping in 1975 in the capacity of "Vice-Chairman in charge of the day-to-day work of the Central Committee".

The 1975 Chinese Constitution reinforced the influence of the party on the state. The Central Committee (and, by extension, its chairman) was placed before the National People's Congress. Article 15 made the Chairman the commander-in-chief of the People's Liberation Army ("the Chairman of the Central Committee of the Chinese Communist Party leads all the armed forces of the country"). These changes were reversed by the 1982 Constitution of the People's Republic of China which placed the Party below the State and created a state CMC in parallel to the Party CMC.

Although Hua Guofeng succeeded Mao as party chairman, by 1978 he had lost power to vice chairman Deng Xiaoping, who at that point had become the de facto leader of China.

By the 1980s, the CCP leadership desired to prevent a single leader from rising above the party, as Mao had done. Accordingly, the post of chairman was abolished in 1982. Most of its functions were transferred to the revived post of General Secretary. The party's last chairman, Hu Yaobang, transferred to the post of General Secretary.

List of chairmen

Chairman of the Central Politburo

Chairman of the Central Committee

List of vice chairmen

 8th Central Committee (1956–1969)
 Liu Shaoqi (expelled in 1968), Zhou Enlai, Zhu De, Chen Yun, Lin Biao (from 1959).
 9th Central Committee (1969–1973)
 Lin Biao (died in 1971).
 10th Central Committee (1973–1977)
 Hua Guofeng (First Vice-chairman from 6 April 1976, chairman from 9 September), Zhou Enlai (died in 1976), Wang Hongwen (arrested in 1976), Kang Sheng (died in 1975), Li Desheng, Ye Jianying, Deng Xiaoping (from 1975 to 1976, and from 1977).
 11th Central Committee (1977–1982)
 Ye Jianying, Deng Xiaoping, Chen Yun, Li Xiannian, Wang Dongxing, Hua Guofeng (from 1981), Zhao Ziyang (from 1981).

References

 
Politics of China
1922 establishments in China
1925 disestablishments in China
1943 establishments in China
1982 disestablishments in China